Terminalia nitens is a species of plant in the Combretaceae family. It is found in Japan and the Philippines. It is threatened by habitat loss.

References

nitens
Flora of Japan
Flora of the Philippines
Trees of Asia
Vulnerable flora of Asia
Taxa named by Carl Borivoj Presl
Taxonomy articles created by Polbot